Elrod is an unincorporated community in Washington Township, Ripley County, in the U.S. state of Indiana.

History
A post office was established at Elrod in 1849, and remained in operation until 1903. George W. Elrod, an early postmaster, gave the community his name.

Geography

References

Unincorporated communities in Ripley County, Indiana
Unincorporated communities in Indiana